Akhat Efes Efes (literally One Zero Zero, translated as Downtown Precinct) is an Israeli police procedural drama television series, revolving around an eccentric Detective named Arik Arbel and his team, which conducts criminal investigations in Tel Aviv.

Cast and characters

Main cast 
 Amos Tamam as Arik Arbel, Israeli police officer
 Efrat Dor as Alex Yudaev, new recruit in the police, Russian born, Anatoly's daughter.
 Maurice Cohen as Motti Ben-Ami, Aric's partner, known as "Motti The Maniac"
 Zohar Strauss as Asrian Babayof, Intelligent criminal mastermind, main antagonist
 Vladimir Friedman as Anatoly Alshinskiy, Asrian's assistant, Alex's father
 Eli Altonio as Dani Babayof, Asrian's brother
 Golan Azoulay as Ezra Elchanani, senior police officer
 Sharon Alexandre as Gideon Berkovich, Head of Police

Recurring cast 
 Ricki Blich as Ronit Arbel, Aric's ex-wife
 Henri David as Ivri, Aric's first partner and his best friend, assassinated
 Dan Mor as Efi, Young detective, known as violent and specialized with explosives and heavy weapons
 Alon Pedut as Yonatan Bar-On, Investigator in Unit of International Crime Investigations
 Shalom Samuelov as Ze'ev Turjeman, mob
 Daniel Gad as Yuval Turjeman
 Herzl Tubi as Benny Turjeman
 Natasha Manor as Marina Yudaev, Alex's mother
 Meirav Shirom as Lital Ben David, police officer from Jerusalem District Police
 Avraham Mor as Avigdor Arbel, Aric's father
 Gil Frank as Shmuel Sheinberg
 Nati Kluger as Sharon Even, investigator from Internal Affairs Department
 Haim Znati as Mookie, Yasam officer

External links
Official Website in Hebrew

Police procedural television series
Israeli action television series
2010s crime television series
2011 Israeli television series debuts
2015 Israeli television series endings